Firozpur railway division is one of the five railway divisions under Northern Railway zone ( NR ) of Indian Railways. This railway division was formed on 14 April 1952 and its headquarters is located at Firozpur in the state of Punjab, India.

Delhi railway division, Ambala railway division, Lucknow NR railway division and Moradabad railway division are the other railway divisions under NR Zone headquartered at New Delhi.

List of railway stations and towns 
The list includes the stations  under the Firozpur railway division and their station category. 

Stations closed for Passengers -

References

 
Divisions of Indian Railways
1952 establishments in East Punjab